Jean-Pierre Blais (born ) is a Canadian lawyer who is currently serving as the Assistant Deputy Minister, Receiver General and Pension for Canada. He previously served as the Chairman of the Canadian Radio-television and Telecommunications Commission (CRTC) from June 18, 2012 until June 2017.

Early life

Blais was raised in the province of Québec, with French as his first language, but learned English at an early age when his family moved to Toronto. He later returned to Montreal and attended Loyola High School.

References 

 (interim)

Living people
Chairpersons of the Canadian Radio-television and Telecommunications Commission
Lawyers in Ontario
Lawyers in Quebec
1960s births
Date of birth missing (living people)